Chile competed in the 2010 Winter Olympics in Vancouver, British Columbia, Canada.

Alpine skiing

Men

Women

Earthquake in Chile
On 27 February 2010, an 8.8 magnitude earthquake struck Chile. As a result, Chilean athletes Jorge Mandrú and Maui Gayme chose not to take part in the closing ceremony out of respect for the victims of the earthquake. Noelle Barahona, the only athlete to remain at Vancouver, carried the flag at the closing ceremony.

See also
 Chile at the Olympics
 Chile at the 2010 Winter Paralympics

Notes and references

Notes

References

Nations at the 2010 Winter Olympics
2010
2010 in Chilean sport